Sous les pieds des femmes (also known as Under Women's Feet) is a 1997 French drama film written and  directed by Rachida Krim and starring Claudia Cardinale.

Plot

Cast 
 Claudia Cardinale  as  Aya   in 1996
 Fejria Deliba	  as  Aya  in 1958
 Nadia Farès  as Fouzia  
 Mohammad Bakri  as Amin 
 Yorgo Voyagis as  Moncef 
 Bernadette Lafont as Suzanne
 Samy Naceri  as Mohammed
  Éric Atlan as Captain Bertrand
 Roland Bertin  as Le Président du tribunal
 Guy Bedos as  Le Procureur
  Kader Boukhanef as  Mourad
 Safy Boutella as  Addellah
  Olivier Brunhes as  Jacques
  Arnaud Meunier as  Jeannot
 Catherine Samie as  La Voisine

References

External links

French drama films
1997 drama films
1997 films
1990s French films